is a Japanese non-fiction manga series written and illustrated by Yūji Yokoyama. It has been serialized in Shogakukan's Weekly Shōnen Sunday since November 2017.

Synopsis
Manga artist Yūji Yokoyama moved from Tokyo to Tokachi, Hokkaido, after being told by Shogakukan's Weekly Shōnen Sunday editor-in-chief Takenori Ichihara to "make the best curry in Japan". Yokoyama is working hard day and night to build a farm in Tokachi. His days of growing vegetables are comically depicted in his manga.

Publication
Shogakukan has collected its chapters into individual tankōbon volumes. The first volume was released on April 12, 2019. As of September 12, 2022, eleven volumes have been released.

Volume list

Reception
In May 2019, it was reported that the series' first volume was selling well at bookstores in Obihiro city and other places.

References

Further reading

External links
 
 

Agriculture and farming in anime and manga
Anime and manga set in Hokkaido
Autobiographical anime and manga
Cooking in anime and manga
Shogakukan manga
Shōnen manga